In computer programming, ellipsis notation (.. or ...) is used to denote ranges, an unspecified number of arguments, or a parent directory.  Most programming languages require the ellipsis to be written as a series of periods; a single (Unicode) ellipsis character cannot be used.

Ranges 
In some programming languages (including Ada, Perl, Ruby, Apache Groovy, Kotlin, Haskell, and Pascal), a shortened two-dot ellipsis is used to represent a range of values given two endpoints; for example, to iterate through a list of integers between 1 and 100 inclusive in Perl:

foreach (1..100)

In Ruby the ... operator denotes a half-open range, i.e. that includes the start value but not the end value.

In Rust the ..= operator denotes an inclusive range for cases in matches and the .. operator represents a range not including the end value.

Perl and Ruby overload the ".." operator in scalar context as a flip-flop operator - a stateful bistable Boolean test, roughly equivalent to "true while x but not yet y", similarly to the "," operator in sed and AWK.

GNU C compatible compilers have an extension to the C and C++ language to allow case ranges in switch statements:
switch(u) {
  case     0 ...   0x7F : putchar(c); break;
  case  0x80 ...  0x7FF : putchar(0xC0 + c>>6);  putchar( 0x80 + c&0x3f); break;
  case 0x800 ... 0xFFFF : putchar(0xE0 + c>>12); putchar( 0x80 + (c>>6)&0x3f); putchar( 0x80 + (c>>12) ); break;
  default: error("not supported!");
}
Additionally, GNU C allows a similar range syntax for designated initializers, available in the C language only:
int array[10] = { [0...5] = 1 };

Delphi / Turbo Pascal / Free Pascal:
var FilteredChars: set of [#0..#32,#127,'a'..'z'];
var CheckedItems: set of [4,10..38,241,58];

In the Unified Modeling Language (UML), a two-character ellipsis is used to indicate variable cardinality of an association. For example, a cardinality of 1..* means that the number of elements aggregated in an association can range from 1 to infinity (a usage equivalent to Kleene plus).

Parent directory

On Windows and Unix-like operating systems, ".." is used to access the parent directory in a path.

Incomplete code 
In Perl and Raku the 3-character ellipsis is also known as the "yada yada yada" operator and, similarly to its linguistic meaning, serves as a "stand-in" for code to be inserted later.

Python3 also allows the 3-character ellipsis to be used as an expressive place-holder for code to be inserted later.

In Abstract Syntax Notation One (ASN.1), the ellipsis is used as an extension marker to indicate the possibility of type extensions in future revisions of a protocol specification. In a type constraint expression like A ::= INTEGER (0..127, ..., 256..511) an ellipsis is used to separate the extension root from extension additions. The definition of type A in version 1 system of the form A ::= INTEGER (0..127, ...) and the definition of type A in version 2 system of the form A ::= INTEGER (0..127, ..., 256..511) constitute an extension series of the same type A in different versions of the same specification. The ellipsis can also be used in compound type definitions to separate the set of fields belonging to the extension root from the set of fields constituting extension additions. Here is an example: B ::= SEQUENCE {  INTEGER, b INTEGER, ..., c INTEGER }

Variable number of parameters

C and C++
In the C programming language, an ellipsis is used to represent a variable number of parameters to a function. For example:

The above function in C could then be called with different types and numbers of parameters such as:

and

C99 introduced macros with a variable number of arguments.

C++11 included the C99 preprocessor, and also introduced templates with a variable number of arguments.

Java

As of version 1.5, Java has adopted this "varargs" functionality. For example:

PHP

PHP 5.6 supports use of ellipsis to define an explicitly variadic function, where ... before an argument in a function definition means that arguments from that point on will be collected into an array. For example:

function variadic_function($a, $b, ...$other)
{
    return $other;
}

var_dump(variadic_function(1, 2, 3, 4, 5));

Produces this output:
  array(3) {
    [0]=>
    int(3)
    [1]=>
    int(4)
    [2]=>
    int(5)
  }

Multiple dimensions 
In Python, particularly in NumPy, an ellipsis is used for slicing an arbitrary number of dimensions for a high-dimensional array:

>>> import numpy as np
>>> t = np.random.rand(2, 3, 4, 5)
>>> t[..., 0].shape # select 1st element from last dimension, copy rest
(2, 3, 4)
>>> t[0, ...].shape # select 1st element from first dimension, copy rest
(3, 4, 5)

Other semantics 
In MATLAB, a three-character ellipsis is used to indicate line continuation, making the sequence of lines
x = [ 1 2 3 ...4 5 6 ];
semantically equivalent to the single line
x = [ 1 2 3 4 5 6 ];

In Raku an actual Unicode (U+2026) ellipsis (…) character is used to serve as a type of marker in a format string.

References

Operators (programming)